Charles C. Mason High School was a high school in Tulsa, Oklahoma from its founding in 1973 until its closing in 1979.

History
Mason was named after Tulsa Public Schools Superintendent Charles Clifford Mason, the longest-tenured superintendent in Tulsa history. The school was the last of Tulsa's public high schools to be established, and operated for just five years before shuttering due to declining enrollment and consolidation efforts in the district. Mason High was designed to serve 1,000 students, but only 465 enrolled when it opened in January 1974. The school board voted 4–2 to close Mason in March 1979, and the final senior class of 199 students graduated that May. Mason's students were sent to Memorial High School, and the building was briefly used by the Tulsa Police Department before being rented in 1983 and outright purchased in 1998 by Metro Christian Academy.

References

Public high schools in Oklahoma
Educational institutions established in 1974
Educational institutions disestablished in 1979
Defunct schools in Oklahoma
Defunct Tulsa Public Schools schools